Cardigan Village is a town on the north-western rural-urban fringe of Ballarat in Victoria, Australia. It was named after James Brudenell, 7th Earl of Cardigan, who led the Charge of the Light Brigade at the Battle of Balaclava during the Crimean War. It is recorded as having a school in 1860, 1903, and 1960; and in 1903 also had a Presbyterian church, a post office, and a hotel.

It stands on the traditional land of the Wadawurrung peoples, on the path they historically took twice a year between Ballarat, where they wintered, and Lake Burrumbeet, where they spent the summer.

References

Suburbs of Ballarat